The Ronald Reagan Park is located in the neighborhood of Przymorze Wielkie, Gdańsk, Poland.

Built between 2003 and 2006 out of formerly barren lands, it covers 40 hectares. It honors  President Ronald Reagan, who was considered instrumental in the fall of Communism in Poland, along with Pope John Paul II.

See als0
 List of things named after Ronald Reagan
 List of buildings and monuments honoring presidents of the United States in other countries

References

External links

 Park map 
 History of the park 

Tourist attractions in Gdańsk
Monuments and memorials to Ronald Reagan
Parks in Poland
Buildings and monuments honoring American presidents in Poland